This is a list of Canadian television-related events in 1954.

Notable events

 CBWT, Winnipeg's CBC Television-Radio Canada Television station debuts on May 31, 1954.

Births
January 31 – Greg Bond, musician, actor and writer (d. 1989)
March 4 – Catherine O'Hara, Canadian–American actress, writer and comedian
March 13 – Robin Duke, actress and comedian (SCTV, Saturday Night Live)
May 24 – Marc Akerstream, actor (d. 1998)
July 5 – Debra McGrath, actress and comedian (SCTV)
August 21 – Johanne Garneau, Québécoise actress
Greg Matthew

Television shows

Debuts
Country Canada
CBC News: The National

Endings
Pépinot et Capucine (1952-1954, SRC)

Programs on-air this year

CBC
Country Canada (1954-2007)
CBC News Magazine (1952-1981) 
The National (1954–present) 
The C.G.E. Show (1952-1959) 
Hockey Night in Canada (1952–present)
Open House (1952-1962)

SRC 
Pépinot et Capucine (1952-1954)

Television stations

References

External links
CBC Directory of Television Series at Queen’s University (Archived March 4, 2016)